is a Japanese singer. She is a former member of the Japanese girl band AKB48. She debuted in AKB48 in February 2006 as a member of the "Team K". Oku's mother is Japanese and her father is Italian.

she was later transferred to Team B

She graduated from AKB48 in April, 2011 when she was 15 years old, and left the entertainment industry to focus on her studies. On March 5, 2018, it was announced Oku's belonging to the talent company Flave Entertainment.

As of January 31, 2020, she no longer belongs to Flave Entertainment as the announcement has been exclusive on her social network.

Career
Oku was born on November 22, 1995, in Tokyo, Japan. In 2006, she auditioned for AKB48 and was cast to Team K. She was also a member of AKB48's subgroup Honegumi (the group was formed for a kids' TV show in 2007). She was transferred to Team B on August 23, 2009. Oku released a solo single named "Katatsumuri" in 2011. The song was used as the end theme to a NHK Educational TV's anime called Ojarumaru.

She played minor roles in the AKB48 dramas Majisuka Gakuen (2010) and Sakura Kara no Tegami (2011). Oku graduated from AKB48 in April 2011.

Discography

Solo singles

References

1995 births
AKB48 members
Living people
Singers from Tokyo
Japanese idols
Japanese women pop singers
21st-century Japanese singers
Japanese child singers
21st-century Japanese women singers